Bruno Barbieri (born 12 January 1962) is an Italian chef, restaurateur, writer and television personality.

Barbieri's restaurants won 7 Michelin Stars, which makes him one of the best-known chefs in Italy and the world. He is the author of popular Italian shows, including MasterChef Italy, and the Celebrity, Junior and All Stars versions with other popular television chefs, including Carlo Cracco, Antonino Cannavacciuolo, Joe Bastianich, Giorgio Locatelli, Alessandro Borghese, Lidia Bastianich and Antonia Klugmann. He is the creator of talent show Bruno Barbieri – 4 hotel, a spin-off of Alessandro Borghese – 4 ristoranti.

Early life
He was born in an Italian family, in Emilia-Romagna. His father moved to Spain when Barbieri was 7 years old, and remained there for 15 years; his mother worked in the textile industry and transmitted him the passion for fashion, instead his grandmother transmitted him the passion for food and cuisine. He graduated at an hospitality vocational high school (istituto alberghiero) in Bologna.

Career 
In 1979 he worked as sous-chef on a cruise ship in order to discover different cuisines from different countries. A year and a half later he returned to Italy to work for restaurants on the Romagna coast as a chef de partie.

After following advanced courses abroad he started working for the restaurant Locanda Solarola, in Castel Guelfo di Bologna. In two years the restaurant earned two Michelin stars. He then worked for the restaurant Il Trigabolo, in Argenta, Emilia–Romagna, with chef and later friend Igles Corelli, assisted by Giacinto Rossetti and Mauro Gualandi. In this restaurant Barbieri cooked for Andy Warhol and during the 1990s the restaurant received two Michelin Stars.

In 2002 he opened Arquade, a restaurant in Hotel Villa del Quar-Relais and Châteaux in San Pietro in Cariano, Veneto. In 2006 the restaurant received two Michelin stars and 3 Gambero Rosso "forks". He left the restaurant in July 2010, and moved to Brazil. In March 2012 he returns to Europe and opens the Cotidie restaurant in London, which he lands to chef Marco Tozzi in 2013 due to his excessive work activities. In 2016 he opened the restaurant Fourghetti, in Bologna, which he lands to Erik Lavacchielli in August 2020.

His books include one dedicated to gluten-free cuisine, written in 2007. He participates to many TV programs for Gambero Rosso Channel and collaborates with various radios. He is the author of successful cuisine series Masterchef Italia, which he has hosted since 2011 alongside other famous Italian chefs. This show steeply escalated Barbieri's fame in the cultural landscape of Italy. Since 2018, he's been host of the show Bruno Barbieri – 4 Hotel.

Personal life
Barbieri is not married. He had a difficult time with his father because he didn't like the idea of him becoming a chef. He is an avid supporter of soccer team Inter Milan, and he played soccer when he was young. He said that his dream is to cook for Queen Elizabeth II and to cook or make a movie with Johnny Depp.

Awards
Barbieri's awards include:

 Locanda Solarola – 2 Michelin Stars
 Trigabolo – 2 Michelin Stars
 Grotta di Brisighella – 1 Michelin Star
 Arquade-Villa – 2 Michelin Stars, 3 Gambero Rosso "forks"

Restaurants
 Cotidie (London)
 Locanda Solarola 
 Trigabolo 
 Grotta di Brisighella 
 Arquade-villa 
 Fourghetti (Bologna)

Television
 MasterChef Italia (2011present)
 Junior MasterChef Italia (20142016)
 Quelli che... il Calcio (20152016)
 MasterChef Italia Celebrity (20172018)
 Bruno Barbieri – 4 hotel (2018present)
 MasterChef Italia All-Stars (20182019)
 Cuochi d'Italia – Il campionato del mondo (2020)

Bibliography

References

Italian restaurateurs
Italian television chefs
Head chefs of Michelin starred restaurants
1962 births
Living people
Italian chief executives
Italian television producers
Chefs of Italian cuisine
Italian cookbook writers
Writers from Emilia-Romagna